Valofane is a sedative drug structurally related to the barbiturates and similar drugs such as primidone. It is metabolized once inside the body to form the barbiturate proxibarbital (proxibarbal) and is thus a prodrug.

References 

Allyl compounds
Ureas
Imides
GABAA receptor positive allosteric modulators
Prodrugs
Sedatives
Tetrahydrofurans
Furanones